Jasmin Vardimon  (born 1971) is an Israeli-born, UK-based choreographer, dancer and artistic director of the Jasmin Vardimon Company, which she formed in 1998 in the UK. Vardimon is an associate artist at Sadler's Wells Theatre, since 2006.

Vardimon has been recognized by the International Theatre Institute (ITI) receiving in 2013 the award for Excellence in International Dance, in recognition of her choreographic work over recent years. Vardimon's contributions to dance and theatre were also recognized by Royal Holloway, University of London, receiving an Honorary Doctorate in 2014. In 2018 she received an honorary fellowship from the Institute of the Arts Barcelona.

Career

Vardimon grew up in a Kibbutz Ein Hahoresh in central Israel. After years of doing athletics and gymnastics she then began dancing at the age of 14. Vardimon became a member of the Kibbutz Contemporary Dance Company for five years and in 1995 moved to Europe following winning the British Council ‘On the Way to London’ Choreography Award.

The Jasmin Vardimon Company (formerly Zbang Dance Company) was founded in London in 1997 and incorporated in 2001.

Vardimon became an associate artist at The Place (1998), and a Yorkshire Dance Partner (1999- 2005). In 2004, Jasmin Vardimon Company became an Arts Council England Regular Funded Organisation (RFO) and since has been supported as an Arts Council England’s National Portfolio Organisation (NPO).

To date two books have been published which explore Jasmin’s work: Jasmin Vardimon’s Dance Theatre, Movement, Memory and Metaphor (2017) by Libby Worth, published by Routledge and Justitia and Multidisciplinary Readings of the Work of the Jasmin Vardimon Company (2016), edited by Paul Johnson and Sylwia Dobkowska, published by Intellect. These are part of the education resources which the company offer.

Vardimon was appointed Member of the Order of the British Empire (MBE) in the 2022 Birthday Honours for services to dance.

Jasmin Vardimon Company

Jasmin Vardimon Company tours nationally and internationally, performing at theatres throughout the UK and internationally.

Vardimon’s choreography is known for its mixture of physical theatre, technologies, text and dance.

The Jasmin Vardimon Company relocated to Ashford, Kent in 2012, opening, ‘The Jasmin Vardimon Production Space’, as its new creative home. The production space is dedicated to the company's creative research and future productions, as well as education residencies and multi-disciplinary artistic study. This space is supported by Ashford Borough Council, Ashford Leisure Trust and Arts Council England.

Jasmin Vardimon Company is funded regularly by the Arts Council England and has also been commissioned by arts institutions and funding bodies such as Sadler's Wells Theatre, Brighton Dome, Kent County Council, The Place, Marlowe Theatre, The Lowry, La Comète (France), National Theatre Studio, South East Dance, Hall for Cornwall, Exeter Northcott Theatre, Take Art, Soho Theatre, DanceXchange, Gardner Arts, Lichfield Garrick Theatre, Laban Centre, Welsh Independent Dance, Yorkshire Dance, Esmée Fairbairn Foundation, Jerwood Foundation, Ovalhouse and the Gulbenkian.

Works
2022 _ ALiCE for Jasmin Vardimon Company
2021 _ Alice in VR Wonderland (virtual reality dance performance) for Jasmin Vardimon Company
2021 - Canvas for JV2 2021
2020 - Dark Moon for JV2 2020
2020* - BodyMap for Jasmin Vardimon Company 
2019 - Tomorrow for JV2 2019
2019 - (In Between) for Ballet Central
2018 - Medusa for Jasmin Vardimon Company, premiered at the Gulbenkian.
2018 - Choreography for Paloma Faith's single, Loyal
2018 - (In Between) for JV2 2018
2017 - Tomorrow for JV2 2017
2016 - Pinocchio for Jasmin Vardimon Company
2016 – Tomorrow for Hellenic Dance Company, Athens Greece
2016 – Tannhauser for Royal Opera House, London
2015 – (In Between) for JV2 2015
2015 – MAZE for Jasmin Vardimon Company
2015 – Tannhäuser for Lyric Opera of Chicago
2014 – Park for Jasmin Vardimon Company
2014 – Tomorrow for JV2 2014
2013 – (In Between) for National Youth Dance Company (NYDC)
2013 – Yesterday for Bitef Theatre, Belgrade Serbia
2013 – Choreography for Atlantis BBC drama (Episode 2)
2013 – Tomorrow for JV2 2013
2012 – Freedom for Jasmin Vardimon Company
2012 – Home for OperaShots season with composer Graham Fitkin, Royal Opera House 2
2011 – Shabbat for Decade Tour, Bare Bones, UK
2010 – 7734 for Jasmin Vardimon Company
2010 – Tannhäuser for Royal Opera House, London
2008 – Yesterday for Jasmin Vardimon Company
2007 – Because for Hellenic Dance Company, Athens Greece
2007 – Justitia for Jasmin Vardimon Company
2005 – Park for Jasmin Vardimon Company
2003 – Lullaby for Jasmin Vardimon Company
2002 – DisEase Room for Welsh Independent Dance, Cardiff
2002 – Oh Mr. Grin for Transition Dance Company, UK
2001 – Ticklish for Jasmin Vardimon Company
2001 – Shabbat for Bare Bones, Birmingham, UK
2000 – LureLureLure for Jasmin Vardimon Company
1999 – Tête for Jasmin Vardimon Company
1998 – Madame Made for Jasmin Vardimon Company
1997 – Therapist for Jasmin Vardimon Company
1995 – Echo Isn't there for Suzanne Dellal Centre, Israel
1993 – Mr. Hole in the Head for Suzanne Dellal Centre, Israel
1992 – Master Morality for Suzanne Dellal Centre, Israel
1991 – Lo Tinaf for Suzanne Dellal Centre, Israel

Awards and recognitions

2022 - Awarded MBE in the Queen's Birthday Honours, for her service to dance.
2019 - Nominated for Best Choreography at the UK Music Video Awards for her choreography for Loyal
2018 - Honorary fellowship from the Institute Arts Barcelona.
2014 - Honorary doctorate from Royal Holloway, University of London
2014 - The Kent Culture Award's Artist Award
2014 - Arts Council England's Exceptional Award in partnership with Turner Contemporary
2014 - Destination East Kent Award 
2014 - Canterbury Award  
2013 - The International Theatre Institute (ITI) Award for Excellence in International Dance
2013 - Dimitrije Parlić Award, Serbia's Choreography Award
2013 - Invited by Sadler's Wells to become the first Artistic Director for the newly formed National Youth Dance Company
2011-14 - Visiting Professor at Wolverhampton University
2006–present - Associate Artist at Sadler's Wells 
2004 - Jerwood Foundation's ‘Changing Stages’ Award
2003 - A nomination for Best Female Artist at the Critics' Circle National Dance Awards
2000 - Jerwood Choreography Award
1999-2005 - Yorkshire Dance Partner
1998 - The London Arts Board ‘New Choreographers’ Award 
1998 - Associate Artist at The Place 
1997 - The Colette Littman Scholarship Award 
1995 - British Council's "On the Way to London" Prize.  (Competition in Israel for young choreographers)

Education company

Jasmin Vardimon has been actively involved within various educational projects and positions.

In 2009 Vardimon developed a Higher Education programme, which has since been led by her company as a Postgraduate Certificate in Physical Theatre for Dancers and Actors at Royal Holloway, University of London.

The Postgraduate Certificate in Physical Theatre for Dancers and Actors is a "Continuing Professional Development course for postgraduate experienced dancers and actors moving into a new area of new work – namely dance theatre. This course introduces new techniques that combine vocal, kinaesthetic and visual skills and responses."

Since September 2011, Vardimon has been a Visiting Professor at the University of Wolverhampton.  Her company donates an annual prize for drama graduates of the university.

In 2012 Vardimon launched JV2, a full-time Professional Development Certificate course at her company's home base in Ashford, Kent.

In 2013 Vardimon was invited by Sadler's Wells Theatre to be the first Artistic Director of the newly formed National Youth Dance Company.

In 2014 she received an honorary doctorate from Royal Holloway, University of London, in recognition of her outstanding achievement in her field, and her contribution to the university and to education generally.

JV2

Jasmin Vardimon Company has formed JV2, offering a one-year Professional Development Certificate course, with the aim to develop, encourage and cultivate young talent and young audiences.

It is a practical course designed to bridge the gap between student and professional life, and aims to train participants as versatile and multi-disciplinary performers by exploring the dialogue between dance and theatre, improving strength, endurance and technique. Towards the end of the course the students form a young company, experiencing touring nationally alongside the Jasmin Vardimon Company.

References

External links 

Jasminvardimon.com,. 'Jasmin Vardimon Company | Jasmin Vardimon Company'. Web. 6 July 2015.

Israeli choreographers
Israeli female dancers
1971 births
Living people
Israeli emigrants to the United Kingdom
Naturalised citizens of the United Kingdom
British choreographers
British female dancers
Members of the Order of the British Empire